Empria is a genus of sawflies belonging to the family Tenthredinidae.

Species
 Empria alboscutellata
 Empria alector
 Empria archangelskii

References

Tenthredinidae
Sawfly genera